Coelogyne lentiginosa is a species of orchid.

lentiginosa